The Adventurers' Guild Bestiary is a supplement for fantasy role-playing games published by Adventurers' Guild in 1987.

Contents
The Adventurers' Guild Bestiary is a supplement that describes 60 monsters of European myth and legend for high-level characters.

Publication history
The Adventurers' Guild Bestiary was written by Brett Dougherty and Todd Dougherty, with art by Mike Bjornson, and was published by Adventurers' Guild in 1987 as a 16-page book.

Reviews
Stewart Wieck, the editor-in-chief of White Wolf Magazine, noted in 1988 that "While nicely formatted, the book doesn't present any especially unique creatures". He also noted that the creatures have fairly concise descriptions, but are noteworthy as they come from "actual mythologies".

References

Fantasy role-playing game supplements
Role-playing game supplements introduced in 1987